Serious as Pleasure is a 1975 French drama film directed by Robert Benayoun.

Cast
 Jane Birkin - Ariane Berg
 Richard Leduc - Bruno
 Raymond Bussières - The fisherman 
 Georges Mansart - Patrice
 Paul Demange - The cards specialist
 Hubert Deschamps - The man at the restaurant
 Marc Dudicourt - The mercier
 Isabelle Huppert - The girl brought back at home
 Francis Perrin - The car seller
 Roger Riffard - Man in the field
 Jacques Spiesser - The man at the 103 kilometer
 Jacques Villeret - The cop on television
 Jean-Luc Bideau - Man on the Road
  - M. Berg, Ariane's father
 Pierre Étaix - The boy upstairs
 Andréa Ferréol - The lady in white
 Serge Gainsbourg - The unknown of the lake
 Michael Lonsdale - Inspector Fournier

See also
 Isabelle Huppert on screen and stage

References

External links

1975 films
French drama films
1970s French-language films
1975 drama films
Films directed by Robert Benayoun
Films with screenplays by Jean-Claude Carrière
1970s French films